The Devil's Servants is a 1970 film produced and distributed by Riga Film Studio. It was written and directed by Aleksandrs Leimanis during the time Latvia was part of the Soviet Union. In 1972, Riga Film Studio released a sequel to this film named The Devil's Servants at the Devil's Mill (Vella kalpi Vella dzirnavās).

Cast
 Lolita Cauka as Rūta
 Haralds Ritenbergs as Andris
 Eduards Pāvuls as Ērmanis
 Olga Dreģe as Anna
 Elza Radziņa as Ģertrūde
 Ingrīda Andriņa as Cecīlija
 Baiba Indriksone as Lēne
 Kārlis Sebris as Samsons
 Edgars Zīle as Salderns
 Ēvalds Valters as Mayor Eks
 Jānis Grantiņš as Daniels Rebuss
 Jānis Osis as Manteifels
 Haralds Topsis as Klāvs Angers
 Valentīns Skulme as General Svenson
 Zigrīda Stungure as Elizabete

References

External links
 

Latvian comedy films
Soviet comedy films
1970 films
Riga Film Studio films